The Harrington knot is a decorative heraldic knot, the badge of the Harrington family. It is in essence identical to the fret.

References

Decorative knots
Heraldic charges
Heraldic knots